WIGW (90.3 FM) is a Christian talk FM radio station in the Lake County area in Florida. This station is owned and operated by Relevant Radio, Inc., and carries its Relevant Radio programming.

External links
 Official Website
 

IGW
Talk radio stations in the United States
Radio stations established in 2012
2012 establishments in Florida
Relevant Radio stations